Colonel Leonard McBury is a North Carolina colonial militia officer who took part in early explorations of present-day Tennessee during the late 18th century.

References

People of colonial North Carolina